The Ladies Professional Racquetball Tour is the latest name for the women's professional racquetball tour. It features the world's best players and several events each season - running from September to May - that are mostly played in the USA.

History

Women's professional racquetball has existed since the 1970s but the women's pro tour began in 1980, when the Women's Professional Racquetball Association (WPRA) was created. The tour was run by International Management Group, and did well in the early 1980s in part due to the great rivalry between Lynn Adams and Heather McKay.  The WPRA lasted until 1994, when the Women's International Racquetball Tour (WIRT) was created.

In 2000, the United States Racquetball Association (USRA) took over administration of the WIRT, and renamed it the Ladies Professional Racquetball Association (LPRA). This led to  significant growth under the supervision of the USRA, which had a three year plan for the LPRA.

In 2005, the players took over control and ownership of the tour, and again it was reorganized and rebranded as the Women's Professional Racquetball Organization. Shannon Feaster, a former player and marketing executive, served as the WPRO Commissioner from February 2006 to May 2011, when she stepped down to focus on her family. Gigi Rock was then hired as the new commissioner in July 2011.

In 2012, the players decided to reorganize and created the LPRT with T. J. Baumbaugh as President and Andy Kulback Deputy Commissioner. Kulback resigned in October 2016.

Current season

2022-2023 (Tier 1 and Grand Slam Events)

Season Summaries (Tier I and Grand Slam Events)

Rankings

Season ending top 10 rankings

 Note - Christie Van Hees announced she was retiring at the end of the 2000-01 season, and was omitted from the season ending rankings despite winning two tournaments that season and being in the finals of two others. She certainly would have been in the top 10 that season.

 Note - Marcy Lynch and Anita Maldonado tied for 4th in 1995-96.

 Note - Toni Bevelock and Molly O'Brien tied for 7th in 1992-93.

Note: In the 1986-85 season, Terri Gilreath and Bonnie Stoll tied for 5th and Molly O'Brien and Sandy Robson tied for 7th.

Most years in top 10

Players ranked #1 at season's end

 1980-81:  Heather McKay
 1981-82:  Lynn Adams
 1982-83:  Heather McKay (2)
 1983-84:  Heather McKay (3)
 1984-85:  Lynn Adams (2)
 1985-86:  Lynn Adams (3)
 1986-87:  Lynn Adams (4)
 1987-88:  Lynn Adams (5)
 1988-89:  Caryn McKinney
 1989-90:  Lynn Adams (6)
 1990-91:  Michelle Gilman
 1991-92:  Jackie Paraiso Gibson
 1992-93:  Michelle Gould (2)
 1993-94:  Michelle Gould (3)
 1994-95:  Michelle Gould (4)
 1995-96:  Michelle Gould (5)
 1996-97:  Michelle Gould (6)
 1997-98:  Michelle Gould (7)
 1998-99:  Jackie Paraiso (2)
 1999-2000:  Jackie Paraiso (3)
 2000-01:  Cheryl Gudinas
 2001-02:  Cheryl Gudinas (2)
 2002-03:  Cheryl Gudinas (3)
 2003-04:  Cheryl Gudinas (4)
 2004-05:  Christie Van Hees
 2005-06:  Rhonda Rajsich
 2006-07:  Rhonda Rajsich (2)
 2007-08:  Rhonda Rajsich (3)
 2008-09:  Paola Longoria
 2009-10:  Paola Longoria (2)
 2010-11:  Rhonda Rajsich (4)
 2011-12:  Paola Longoria (3)
 2012-13:  Paola Longoria (4)
 2013-14:  Paola Longoria (5)
 2014-15:  Paola Longoria (6)
 2015-16:  Paola Longoria (7)
 2016-17:  Paola Longoria (8)
 2017-18:  Paola Longoria (9)
 2018-19:  Paola Longoria (10)
 2019-20:  Paola Longoria (11)
 2020-21:  Paola Longoria (12)
 2021-22:  Paola Longoria (13)

References

External links

International Racquetball Tour

Racquetball competitions
Sports competition series